Otmar Striedinger (born 14 April 1991) is an Austrian World Cup alpine ski racer.

Born in Villach, Carinthia, Striedinger made his World Cup debut in November 2010 at Lake Louise, Canada. He attained his first World Cup podium in December 2013, a second place in Super-G at Beaver Creek, US.

World Cup results

Season standings
{| class=wikitable style="text-align:center"
! Season 
! Age 
! Overall 
! Slalom 
! Giantslalom
! Super-G 
! Downhill 
! Combined
|-
| 2013 ||21|| 110 || — || — || — || 43 || —
|-
| 2014 ||22|| 33 || — || — || 7 || 22 || —
|-
| 2015 ||23|| 37 || — || — || 14 || 24 || —
|-
| 2016 ||24|| 60 || — || — || 37 || 24 || —
|-
| 2017 ||25|| 118 || — || — || 40 || 50 || —
|-
| 2018 ||26|| 109 || — || — || — || 34 || —
|-
| 2019 ||27||43 ||—||—||50||11||—  
|-
| 2020 ||28||78 ||—||—||—||23||—  
|-
|2021||29|| 47 || — || — || — || 7 || rowspan=3 
|-
| 2022||30||45|| — ||—||52||13
|-
| 2023||31||39|| — ||— ||49||13 
|}

Race podiums
 0 wins
 5 podiums – (4 DH, 1 SG); 19 top tens

World Championship results

Olympic results

References

External links

 
 
 
 Otmar Striedinger at Austrian Ski team ''
 

1991 births
Living people
Austrian male alpine skiers
Alpine skiers at the 2014 Winter Olympics
Olympic alpine skiers of Austria